Göyazan Qazakh FK is an Azerbaijani football club. The club currently takes part in Azerbaijan First Division.

History
The club was founded in 1978, re-established in 1986 and 2003. FC Goyazan participated in five Soviet Second League seasons during 1987–1991 years and ranked 5th in 1988 and made its best indicator. In 1986 they also won Azerbaijan USSR League.

The team did not enter consecutively latest five Azerbaijan Cup seasons, even though it participated in Azerbaijan First Division.

Honours 
Azerbaijan USSR League
 Champions (1) : 1986

 AFFA Amateur League
 Winners (1) : 2002–03

League and domestic cup history

External links
 FK Goyazan at PFL.AZ

Football clubs in Azerbaijan
Association football clubs established in 1978
1978 establishments in Azerbaijan
Defunct football clubs in Azerbaijan
Association football clubs disestablished in 2017
2017 disestablishments in Azerbaijan